Macarlar is a village in the central (Balıkesir) district of Balıkesir Province, Turkey. The village is under the impact of Mediterranean climate and has a population of 1,730.

References 

Villages in Balıkesir Province